Arunah Metcalf (February 14, 1771 – August 15, 1848) was a United States representative from New York.

Biography
Born in Lebanon, Connecticut, on February 14, 1771, he attended the common schools of Lebanon.

In the late 18th century he moved from Connecticut to New York, and settled in Otsego County.  Metcalf was part of the "Metcalf Setlement" in Pierstown, which included many of his family members, among them his father and stepmother.  Arunah Metcalf owned a farm in the area now known as Metcalf Hill. In addition to operating his farm, Metcalf was involved in other business ventures and became a successful land speculator.

Metcalf served in the state militia, holding the rank of ensign in an Otsego County company.  He also became active in local government, including serving as deputy sheriff.  From 1806 to 1810 he was Sheriff of Otsego County, New York.

He was elected as a Democratic-Republican to the Twelfth Congress, holding office from March 4, 1811, to March 3, 1813.  After serving in Congress Metcalf relocated to Cooperstown. He served in the New York State Assembly from 1814 to 1816.

He was a founder of the Otsego County Agricultural Society and served as its president in 1818.

In 1819 Metcalf ran unsuccessfully for the New York State Senate.  He served in the Assembly again in 1828.

He died in Cooperstown on August 15, 1848.  He was buried at Lakewood Cemetery in Cooperstown.

Legacy
There is a mountain in Otsego County, New York, named after him called Metcalf Hill.

References

1771 births
1848 deaths
People from Lebanon, Connecticut
People from Cooperstown, New York
Sheriffs of Otsego County, New York
Members of the New York State Assembly
Democratic-Republican Party members of the United States House of Representatives from New York (state)
Burials in New York (state)